Eleonore Dailly is an American filmmaker.  She was born in Paris and raised in New York City. Her producing credits include I Am Not An Easy Man, a Netflix hit comedy, Mixte, I Love America and 'Dirt! The Movie, a feature-length film which premiered in competition at Sundance Film Festival.

Career

Producing
Dailly received an MFA from the USC School of Cinematic Arts Peter Stark Producer Program in 2007. She began her career in development at DreamWorks and with Academy Award producer Bruce Cohen. Dailly produced and co-directed the feature film DIRT!, featuring Jamie Lee Curtis, which was nominated for the Grand Jury Prize at the Sundance Film Festival before premiering on PBS's Independent Lens. She then developed and produced Swelter, a moody action film starring Alfred Molina, Catalina Sandino Moreno, Lennie James, Grant Bowler and Jean-Claude Van Damme, which was released in August 2014 and has been nominated for the 19th Satellite Awards.
 
Dailly is a member of Producers Guild of America, the Academy of Television Arts and Sciences, Women in Film. She co-chairs the Alliance of Women Directors (AWD), a non-profit company promoting parity for female directors that partners with Women In Film and the Sundance Initiative for Women Directors. Other members of the AWD include Debra Granik, Michelle McLarren, Leslie Linka Glatter, Ava DuVernay and Jen McGowan.
Dailly now runs the production outfit Autopilot which focuses on television and feature film development. She also coordinated publicity for FX's Emmy-nominated television series Justified.

Law
Dailly received her Juris Doctor degree from Columbia University School of Law in 1998, with a focus on intellectual property and finance law. While at Columbia, she worked with Jane Carol Ginsburg, as her research assistant on issues of intellectual property law. Dailly then practiced international civil litigation in New York City for Sullivan & Cromwell and Morrison & Foerster and human rights law in Argentina, Kenya and Uganda.

Awards
In 2007, Eleonore Dailly was awarded the Debra Hill Fellowship for promising, young female filmmakers for her work on feature film development.

Filmography

 Dirt! The Movie
 Swelter
 Sister Cities
 I Am Not An Easy Man
 Mixte
 I Love America
 Les Liaisons Dangereuses

References

External links

Date of birth unknown
Living people
Artists from New York City
People from Los Angeles
American filmmakers
USC School of Cinematic Arts alumni
Sullivan & Cromwell people
Columbia Law School alumni
Year of birth missing (living people)
People associated with Morrison & Foerster